This is a list of transfers in Dutch football for the 2015-2016 winter transfer window. Only moves featuring an Eredivisie side are listed.

The winter transfer window will open on January 1, 2016, and will close on February 2, 2016. Deals may be signed at any given moment in the season, but the actual transfer may only take place during the transfer window. Unattached players may sign at any moment.

Notes
 Transfer will take place on January 1, 2016.

References

Football transfers Winter 2015-16
2015
Dutch